Karsu is a village in the Altınözü district of Hatay Province in the south of Turkey.

The neighbourhood has a Mediterranean climate.

Economy
The neighbourhood economy of the area is agricultural and livestock.

Infrastructure
The road leading to the neighborhood is asphalt and there is an electricity supply, fixed telephone lines and a drinking water network.
There are village schools.

Notable people
Karsu Dönmez, a singer, pianist and composer born in Amsterdam, was named after the village by her parents, who came from the village.

References

Villages in Hatay Province